Mullakkodi  is a village in Mayyil Gram Panchayat of Kannur District situated on the East Bank of Valapattanam river. Mullakkodi known for its backwaters, paddy fields and for its community festival called the Ayar Munamba Manna Maqam Urooz.

Educational institutions
Mullakkodi AUP School
Mullakkodi Mappila ALP School
Arimbra English Medium School
Izzathul Islam Madrasa

Cultural organisations
Mullakkodi C R C Vayanashala & Grandalayam
Navodaya Kalasamithi
Islamic Cultural Society
CRC Sports Club and Nehru Yuva Kendra
Love Star Sports club, Mullakkodi
Balasangham, Kudumba Sree Mullakkodi Unit

Festivals 

 Festival at Arimbra Subramanya Swamy Temple in the month of March (22 March) 
 Chonnamma Kaavu Festival in the month of Feb (First week of Feb)
 Aayar Munamba Manna Maqam Urooz
 Vettakkarumakan temple Festival in the month of April (last week of April)
 Vayanattu kulavan temple festival  in month of March (first week of March)

Transportation 
The national highway passes through Valapattanam town.  Goa and Mumbai can be accessed on the northern side and Cochin and Thiruvananthapuram can be accessed on the southern side.  The road to the east of Iritty connects to Mysore and Bangalore.  The nearest railway station is Kannur on the Mangalore-Palakkad line. 
Trains are available to almost all parts of India subject to advance booking over the internet.  There are airports at Mattanur, Mangalore and Calicut. All of them are international airports but direct flights are available only to Middle Eastern countries.
Since the inauguration of Nanicheri Kadavu Bridge by Kerala CM Pinarayi Vijayan, the time taken to reach Taliparamba hence Payyannur, Kasaragod reduced drastically for those who are coming from Mattannur, Iritty etc.
James Mathew MLA has spearheaded the speedy construction of the bridge.

References

Villages near Mayyil